Hanlin may refer to:
Hanlin, Burma
Hanlin Academy, an institution of imperial China
Tom Hanlin, a Scottish fiction writer